San Vicente was a village located in Brewster County, Texas within the protruding big bend of the Rio Grandé river. The uninhabited site provides a panoramic view of the Chisos Mountains and the Sierra San Vicente migrating into Northern Mexico.

Historical Citations of San Vicente
San Vicente settlement established cemeteries north and south of the village vicinity encompassing  between the memorial grounds. The south funerary plot, also known as the San Vicente Crossing cemetery, has a proximity to the San Vicente Crossing on the Rio Grandé river.

Presidio of San Vicente

On September 10, 1772, the Spanish Empire issued new regulations for presidios constructed in New Spain along the southern boundaries of the Rio Grandé river basin in the Northern Mexico territories. Presidio de San Vicente was established in 1773 offering sanctuary for Spanish Texas pioneers seeking passage through the San Vicente Crossing at the Rio Grandé river. The presidio fortification was an adobe and pueblo style structure serving as a garrison while providing a defensive wall against the native plains inhabitants during the Mexican Indian Wars. The Spanish Presidio coerced the territorial development of New Spain in the Chihuahua and Coahuila territories of the Spanish America colonies while fortifying the Spanish missions in Texas.

See also

References

Audiobook Bibliography

Bibliography

External links
 
 
 
 
 
 

Geography of Brewster County, Texas
Ghost towns in West Texas
History of Texas